is a 1991 Japanese drama film written, edited and directed by Takeshi Kitano starring Claude Maki.

Plot
A deaf garbage collector happens upon a broken and discarded surfboard. The discovery plants in him dreams of becoming a surf champion. Encouraged by his also deaf girlfriend, he persists against all odds.

Production
This movie was a break from previous Kitano fare in that it features no gangsters or police. However, Kitano did return to darker themes in his next film, Sonatine, as well as many later works. In the film, Kitano develops his more delicate, romantic side along with his trademark deadpan approach. In 2002, the Japanese filmmaker directed a similar movie, Dolls, a romantic tale about three pairs of lovers.

This film marks the first collaboration between Kitano and composer Joe Hisaishi, who had previously created the acclaimed soundtracks of many of Hayao Miyazaki's anime films, including Nausicaä of the Valley of the Wind. Hisaishi would go on to compose the soundtracks for all of Kitano's films until Dolls, after which their collaboration ended.

Occasional Office Kitano actor, Claude Maki, who plays the mute main character, went on to appear in Kitano's film Brother as Ken, a Japanese-American punk set to become leader of a Yakuza clan. In Brother, Claude speaks mostly in American-English with some occasional Japanese.

Soundtrack

The soundtrack CD was originally released on November 25, 1992, by Toshiba EMI; then, re-released many times by Milan Records and Wonderland Records.

 "Silent Love (Main Theme)" − 6:52
 "Cliffside Waltz I" − 3:58
 "Island Song" − 3:39
 "Silent Love (In Search of Something)" − 1:10
 "Bus Stop" − 5:11
 "While at Work" − 1:22
 "Cliffside Waltz II" − 3:44
 "Solitude" − 1:12
 "Melody of Love" − 1:41
 "Silent Love (Forever)" − 3:30
 "Alone" − 1:04
 "Next Is My Turn" − 0:45
 "Wave Cruising" − 4:02
 "Cliffside Waltz III" − 3:40

See also
Surf film

External links

 

1991 films
Japanese romance films
1990s Japanese-language films
1990s romance films
Surfing films
Films directed by Takeshi Kitano
Films set in Yokosuka
Films scored by Joe Hisaishi
Films about deaf people
1990s Japanese films